Let the Hustlers Play is the third studio album by American rapper Steady B.

Track listing
Let the Hustlers Play 	4:22
Certified Dope 	3:23 	
The Undertaker 	5:33 	
I Got Cha 	3:17 	
Turn It Loose 	4:07 	
Ya Know My Rucka 	4:20 	
Serious 	3:23 	
Do What You Wanna Do 	3:57 	
Who's Makin' Ya Dance 	4:04 	
On the Real Tip 	2:27
Through Thick-N-Thin 	3:04

Charts

External links 
 Let the Hustlers Play on Discogs

References

1988 albums
Steady B albums
Jive Records albums